Vasili Nikolayevich Penyasov (born 27 July 1987) is a former Russian professional football player.

Club career
He played in the Russian Football National League for FC Sodovik Sterlitamak in 2007.

External links
 
 

1987 births
Living people
Russian footballers
Association football defenders
PFC CSKA Moscow players
FC Sodovik Sterlitamak players
FC Tyumen players
FC Znamya Truda Orekhovo-Zuyevo players